Shackaloa Creek is a stream in the U.S. state of Mississippi.

Shackaloa is a name derived from the Choctaw language meaning "cypress tree". A variant name is "Stockaloa Creek".

References

Rivers of Mississippi
Rivers of Amite County, Mississippi
Rivers of Franklin County, Mississippi
Mississippi placenames of Native American origin